The Chattanooga Mocs wrestling team represents the University of Tennessee at Chattanooga (UTC) as a Member of the Southern Conference (SoCon) of NCAA Division I wrestling. The Mocs host their home matches at the Maclellan Gymnasium on the university's campus in Chattanooga, Tennessee, United States. The Mocs' current head coach is Kyle Ruschell, a former 2-time All-American at the University of Wisconsin.

History
The wrestling team at UTC began competing in the Southeastern Intercollegiate Wrestling Association (SEIWA) in 1947. The program joined Division II when the NCAA started the new division in 1963. Under five coaches during the Division II era, 40 Mocs won 62 SEIWA individual championships, and the program qualified for the NCAA Division II Championships as a team 1972–77, placing as high as second in the 1976. Also, seven wrestlers earned twelve NCAA Division II All-American citations, and three won six individual championships.

The Mocs moved to Division I and the Southern Conference in 1978 and is the only NCAA Division I wrestling program in the state of Tennessee. Since joining, the Mocs have been the single most dominant team in the SoCon, winning 186 individual conference championships, 13 regular season league crowns (only awarded since 1992), and 28 conference tournament titles. During the Division I era, nine UTC wrestlers have earned twelve All-American citations, and the Mocs have scored at the NCAA Division I Championships every year except 1990, placing as high as 21st in 2005 and 2007. Eight of nine Division I head coaches have been named SoCon Coach of the Year sixteen times, including twice by current coach Heath Eslinger.

Head Coaches
The Mocs' current head coach is Kyle Ruschell.  Ruschell joined the Mocs staff in June 2018 as assistant coach.  He was elevated to Interim Head Coach on July 19, following head coach Heath Eslinger's resignation and earned the full-time position on Aug. 10, 2019.   Ruschell's staff includes assistant coaches TJ Ruschell and Hunter Gamble.

Southern Conference 100th Anniversary Wrestling Team
The Southern Conference celebrated 100 years of operation in 2021. The league named 100th anniversary teams in each sport it currently sponsors and has sponsored for at least 25 years. Of all member schools (currently and former), the Chattanooga Mocs top the list with 23 wrestlers selected. Members of the 100th anniversary team must meet at least one of the following criteria: SoCon Hall of Fame Inductee (for primary sport), National Wrestler of the Year, National Champion, All-America in two different seasons (not including honorable mention or freshman AA), SoCon Male Athlete of the Year, Two-time SoCon Wrestler of the Year, Three-time SoCon Individual Champion, or 1st-team All-SoCon in three different seasons.

NCAA Division I All Americans

NCAA Division II All Americans

References

External links

 
1947 establishments in Tennessee
Sports clubs established in 1947